Good for Otto is an American play by David Rabe.

Plot
Dr. Michaels and fellow counselor Evangeline counsel six patients at a rural mental health center.

Critical reception
The Guardian awarded the play three stars out of five, calling it "Intimately staged yet strangely old-fashioned."

The Hollywood Reporter said in a review, "This shapeless play loses rather than gathers steam, ultimately seeming more like a docudrama patchwork with messy stitching than a satisfying, fully realized theatrical work."

References

External links

2015 plays
Broadway plays
Off-Broadway plays
Plays by David Rabe
Fiction set in the 2010s